"Silence" is a song by Canadian electronic music group Delerium featuring Canadian singer and co-writer Sarah McLachlan, first released in May 1999. Over the years, its remixes have been hailed as one of the greatest trance songs of all time, over a decade after its initial release. The Tiësto remix of the song was voted by Mixmag readers as the 12th greatest dance record of all time.

Song
The original album version and subsequent radio edit of the song had a much slower tempo than the more well-known remixes and was essentially structured like a pop song, with the characteristic synthetic instrumentation of the more melodic side of ambient music — though including darker overtones, such as the prominently featured Gregorian chant (Gloria in Excelsis Deo). This last element often invites comparison to popular ambient/new age/world music projects of the 1990s like Enigma and Deep Forest who routinely sample chants from various ethnicities worldwide, though in contrast such vocals featured on Karma were all original recordings.

Although the original song did receive Canadian radio airplay in 1997, it was not released as a single until 1999, two years after the release of Karma, though it was only the Airscape Remix which received airplay at this time, rather than the more downtempo original version. The single prominently included remixes by DJ Tiësto, and Fade, which significantly boosted the song's proliferation through club play (particularly by influential DJs such as Paul Oakenfold) as evidenced by the single's positions on the Billboard Hot Dance Music/Club Play charts. It was on the soundtrack for the movie Brokedown Palace featuring Claire Danes and Kate Beckinsale.

As a consequence, the song was largely promoted as an uptempo vocal trance song, which then influenced the marketing of the next several Delerium singles as well. Unlike most of its successors, however, "Silence" also broke into the adult top 40 radio format due to the song's club success, and through radio airplay the original version received mainstream awareness relatively greater than the remixes among club patrons.

Music video
The accompanying music video, directed by the directors collective Twobigeyes, was released in 2000 and was set to the Airscape remix. It has repeatedly been listed within the top 100 Ibiza anthems ever on online messageboards and, more recently, on MTV.  The video was filmed on location in the United Kingdom ― mainly at Newgale Beach, Marloes Sands and "The Blue Lagoon" in Abereiddy, all in Pembrokeshire, Wales. Versions of the video featuring the Tiësto and Above & Beyond remixes followed the initial release.

A music video for "Aria", a track from the following studio album "Poem" that was first released as B-Side on a "Silence" single, was released in early 2000, featuring the Mediæval Bæbes. The single and video use the video edit of the song.

Re-releases
2004 saw a new release of the single as "Silence 2004", though no song actually bears that title — the new single went to number one on the US dance chart and contained only remixes, both old and new. Of these, the new Above & Beyond remix is the most central, as the version included on the compilation The Best Of released in advance of the single. The other new remix was by Filterheadz; this version subsequently, in 2006, became popularly mislabelled as the nonexistent "Trentemøller 2006 Remix". A 2017 version of the song entitled "Rhys Fulber Project Cars Mix" featured in the launch trailer for Project CARS 2.

Track listings
UK CD single 1999
 "Silence (Sanctuary Mix Edit by Fade)" – 4:18
 "Silence (Album Version Edit)" – 4:06
 "Silence (Sanctuary Mix by Fade)" – 11:12

US CD single 2000
 "Silence (Edit)" – 4:08
 "Silence (DJ Tiësto In Search of Sunrise Remix)" – 11:33
 "Silence (Airscape Remix)" – 8:37
 "Silence (Sanctuary Mix by Fade)" – 11:12
 "Aria" – 3.59

UK CD single 1 2000
 "Silence (Airscape Remix Edit)" – 3:48
 "Silence (DJ Tiësto In Search of Sunrise Remix)" – 11:36
 "Silence (Album Version Edit)" – 4:06

UK CD single 2 2000
 "Silence (Airscape Remix) – 8:38
 "Silence (Original Fade Sanctuary Mix)" – 11:12

Benelux maxi single 2000
 "Silence (Airscape Remix Edit)" – 3:46
 "Silence (DJ Tiësto In Search of Sunrise Remix)" – 11:29
 "Silence (Airscape Remix) – 8:37
 "Silence (Original Fade Sanctuary Mix)" – 11:12
 "Silence (Album Version Edit)" – 4:06

Benelux CD single 2000
 "Silence (DJ Tiësto's In Search of Sunrise Remix – Patrick Kicken Re-Edit)" – 5:11
 "Silence (DJ Tiësto's In Search of Sunrise Remix Edit)" – 4:24

German CD single 2000
 "Silence (DJ Tiësto's In Search of Sunrise Remix Edit)" – 3:58
 "Silence (Airscape Remix Edit)" – 3:47
 "Silence (Album Version Edit)" – 4:04
 "Silence (DJ Tiësto's In Search of Sunrise Remix)" – 11:31
 "Silence (Airscape Remix) – 8:36
 "Silence (Original Fade Sanctuary Mix)" – 11:07

US maxi single 2004
 "Silence (Above & Beyond's 21st Century Edit)" – 3:42
 "Silence (Filterheadz Remix)" – 7:27
 "Silence (Above & Beyond's 21st Century Remix)" – 8:51
 "Silence (Fade's Sanctuary Mix Edit)" – 3:50
 "Silence (DJ Tiësto's In Search of Sunrise Remix)" – 11:33
 "Silence (Michael Woods Mix)" – 8:08

UK CD single 2004
 "Silence (Above & Beyond's 21st Century Edit)" – 3:39
 "Silence (Filterheadz Remix)" – 7:33
 "Silence (Airscape Remix Edit)" – 3:39
 "Silence (Fade's Sanctuary Mix Edit)" – 3:51
 "Silence (Tiësto's In Search of Sunrise Remix)" – 11:32
 "Silence (Michael Woods Mix)" – 8:05

European CD maxi 2008
 "Silence (Niels van Gogh vs. Thomas Gold Radio Edit)" – 3:29
 "Silence (Niels van Gogh vs. Thomas Gold Remix)" – 7:34
 "Silence (Lissat & Voltaxx Remix)" – 8:17
 "Silence (DJ Tiësto's In Search of Sunrise Remix)" – 11:29
 "Silence (Sanctuary Mix)" – 11:12
 "Silence (Acoustic Version)" – 5:06

US The Essential Silence Digital Download 2010
 "Silence (Album Version)" – 6:35
 "Silence (Fade's Sanctuary Remix Edit)" – 4:22
 "Silence (DJ Tiësto's In Search of Sunrise Remix)" – 11:36
 "Silence (Airscape Remix) – 8:38
 "Silence (Michael Woods Mix)" – 7:13
 "Silence (Above & Beyond's 21st Century Remix)" – 8:51
 "Silence (Filterheadz Remix)" – 7:32
 "Silence (Lissat & Voltaxx Remix)" – 8:18
 "Silence (Niels van Gogh Vs. Thomas Gold Remix)" – 7:33

Digital release 2011
 "Silence (David Esse & Antoine Clamaran Remix)" – 8:45
 "Silence (David Esse & Antoine Clamaran Remix Edit)" – 4:15

Digital release 2012
 "Silence (W&W vs. Jonas Stenberg Remix)" – 5:28

Digital release 2016
 Silence (Alyx Ander vs. Delerium – Original Mix) – 5:31
 Silence (Alyx Ander vs. Delerium – Radio Edit) – 3:39

Digital release 2017
 Silence (Rhys Fulber Project Cars Remix) – 6:27
 Silence (Rhys Fulber Project Cars Dub) – 6:17

Digital release 2019
 Silence (Youngr's 20 Years of Silence Remix) - 4:28
 Silence (Dark Matter Remix) - 8:38

'Digital release 2021 
 Silence (Jens O. remix) Jay Frog - 2:56

Charts and certifications

Weekly charts

Original version

2000 remixes

"Silence 2004"

"Silence 2008"

Year-end charts

Original version

2000 remixes

"Silence 2008"

Certifications

Release history

See also
 List of number-one dance singles of 2005 (U.S.)

Notes

References

External links
 
 
 

1997 songs
1999 singles
2000 singles
2004 singles
Delerium songs
Festival Records singles
Irish Singles Chart number-one singles
Juno Award for Dance Recording of the Year recordings
Nettwerk Records singles
Number-one singles in Scotland
Sarah McLachlan songs
Songs written by Bill Leeb
Songs written by Rhys Fulber
Songs written by Sarah McLachlan
Trance songs
UK Independent Singles Chart number-one singles